Jeff Falk (born in Chesapeake, VA) is a former NASCAR driver. He ran four races in the Busch Series during 2001.
Those four races all came in the #8 Chevy owned by Armando Fitz. He started the #8 Chevy in 40th position at Richmond, but peaked at 31st. He improved at Nazareth with a 29th and then managed 24th at Bristol, which was his career best and last career start. Falk came from Nashville Speedway USA and after Fitz moved on to Kerry Earnhardt, Falk did a number of races at the track.

References

External links
 

Year of birth missing (living people)
Living people
NASCAR drivers
ARCA Menards Series drivers
Sportspeople from Chesapeake, Virginia
Racing drivers from Virginia